¡Ay qué rechula es Puebla! is a 1946 Mexican film directed by René Cardona. It stars Antonio Badú, Sara García and Jorge Reyes.

External links
 

1946 films
1940s Spanish-language films
Mexican black-and-white films
Mexican comedy-drama films
1946 comedy-drama films
1940s Mexican films